Fish scales are the rigid plates on the skin of a fish.

Fish scale may also refer to:

 "Fish Scale" (song), a 2022 song by rapper YoungBoy Never Broke Again
 Fish Scales, a rapper in the group Nappy Roots
 Fishscale,  a 2006 album by Ghostface Killah
 "Fish Scale", a 1977 song by The David Grisman Quintet from the eponynous album
 A weighing scale to measure the weight of fish
 Traditional Canadian name for a 5 cent piece
 A texture found on waxless Nordic skis; see Ski wax

See also
 Fish-scale gecko